The Greater Baltimore Golf Classic was a golf tournament on the LPGA Tour from 1962 to 1980. It was played at the Turf Valley Country Club in Ellicott City, Maryland from 1962 to 1966 and at the Pine Ridge Golf Course in Timonium, Maryland from 1967 to 1980.

Winners
Greater Baltimore Golf Classic
1980 Pat Bradley

Greater Baltimore Classic
1979 Pat Meyers
1978 Nancy Lopez

Greater Baltimore Golf Classic
1977 Jane Blalock

Baltimore Classic
1975-76 No tournament
1974 Judy Rankin

Lady Carling Open
1973 Judy Rankin
1972 Carol Mann
1971 Kathy Whitworth
1970 Shirley Englehorn
1969 Susie Berning
1968 Kathy Whitworth
1967 Mickey Wright
1966 Kathy Whitworth
1965 Carol Mann
1964 Clifford Ann Creed

Sight Open
1963 Marlene Hagge

Kelly Girls Open
1962 Kathy Whitworth

See also
Lady Carling Eastern Open - another LPGA Tour event, played in Massachusetts from 1962 to 1966
Danbury Lady Carling Open - another LPGA Tour event, played in Connecticut in 1969

References

Former LPGA Tour events
Recurring sporting events established in 1964
Recurring events disestablished in 1980
Golf in Maryland
1962 establishments in Maryland
1980 disestablishments in Maryland
Women's sports in Maryland